Sir John Grey Egerton, 8th Baronet (11 July 1766 – 24 May 1825) was a politician from the Egerton family in Cheshire, England. He was Member of Parliament (MP) for Chester from 1807 to 1818.

Born John Egerton, the son of Philip Egerton of Oulton by his cousin, Mary, sister and sole heiress of Sir John Haskin Eyles Styles, 4th Bt. He was educated at King's School, Chester and Tarvin School. He served as High Sheriff of Cheshire for 1793–94.

In 1814, he succeeded to the Egerton baronetcy on the death of Thomas Egerton, Viscount Grey de Wilton and Earl of Wilton, a distant relative, and took the surname Grey Egerton. His family seat was Oulton Park. He became a successful racehorse owner, and served as Grand Master of the Cheshire Freemasons. 

On 9 April 1795 he married Maria, daughter of and sole heir of Thomas Scott Jackson, a Director of Bank of England.

He died in London, aged 58, a few days after a carriage accident on 19 May 1825, decessit sine prole at Epsom Races. His funeral at Little Budworth on 8 June 1825 was attended by 10,000–12,000 people, with 17 of the 19 Cheshire Freemason Lodges being present. 

He was succeeded by his brother, Philip. His wife, Maria, died, and then was buried on 23 August 1830.

References 

Bibliography
 Burke's Peerage, 106h ed., (1999)
 Burke's Peerage, 107th ed., (2003)
 Cokayne and Gibbs, The Complete Peerage, XV vols, (1910-1998)

External links 
 

1766 births
1825 deaths
Members of the Parliament of the United Kingdom for English constituencies
UK MPs 1807–1812
UK MPs 1812–1818
Baronets in the Baronetage of England